University of Taipei (UT) is an institution of higher education in Taipei, Taiwan. It has two campuses in Taipei metropolitan area and is the only university under the administration of Taipei City Government.

Established by the merger of Taipei Municipal University of Education and the Taipei Physical Education College in August 2013, University of Taipei can trace its roots into the late 19th century.

Academics 

Prior to the merger, TMUE have 4,800 students enrolled and TPEC 2,700. Today roughly 7,500 students are enrolled in University of Taipei. The university currently consists of five colleges:

College of Arts and Humanities
Department of Chinese Language and Literature
Department of Social and Public Affairs
Department of History and Geography
Department of Music
Department of Visual Arts
Department of English Instruction
Department of Dance
Master's Program in Teaching Chinese as a Second Language
Master's Program of Teaching of Social Studies
Research Center for Confucian Studies
Arts Center
Chinese Learning Center

College of Education
Department of Education
Department of Psychology and Counseling
Department of Early Childhood Education
Department of Special Education
Department of Learning and Materials Design
Graduate School of Educational Administration and Evaluation
Master's Program of Speech and Language Pathology
College of Science
Department and Graduate Institute of Physical Education  
Department of Computer Science
Department of Applied Physics and Chemistry
Department of Mathematics
Department of Earth and Life Sciences
Master's Program E-Learning
Science Education Center
College of Kinesiology
Department of Ball Sports
Department of Athletics
Department of Recreation and Sport Management
Department of Exercise and Health Sciences
Department of Aquatic Sports
Department of Martial Arts
Department of Sport Performing Arts
Graduate Institute of Sports Sciences
Graduate Institute of Sports Equipment Technology
Graduate Institute of Sport Pedagogy
Graduate Institute of Sports Training
Master's Program of Transition and Leisure Education for Individuals with Disabilities
College of City Management
Department of Health and Welfare
Department of Urban Development
Department of Urban Industrial Management and Marketing

Transportation
The Main Campus is accessible within walking distance West from Chiang Kai-shek Memorial Hall Station of the Taipei Metro. The Tianmu Campus is accessible within walking distance East from Zhishan Station of the Taipei Metro.

Rankings

University of Taipei was not ranked by Times Higher Education, and it was ranked 451-500 in QS Asia University Rankings in 2023.

See also
 List of universities in Taiwan

References

 
2013 establishments in Taiwan
Educational institutions established in 2013
Universities and colleges in Taiwan
Universities and colleges in Taipei
Technical universities and colleges in Taiwan